Hendrik Redant (born 1 November 1962 in Ninove) is a Belgian former professional cyclist. He was a directeur sportif with the Omega Pharma–Lotto cycling team until the end of the 2010 season. For 2011 he left Omega Pharma–Lotto to take up a position with the Australian Pegasus Sports Racing team. The team folded before making its debut. He currently works as a directeur sportif for UCI ProTeam .

Major results

1984
1st Stage 4 Ronde van Brabant
1987
1st Omloop van het Houtland
 2nd Dwars door West-Vlaanderen
1988
1st Stage 4 Tour of Belgium
1st Stage 3 Driedaagse van De Panne
1st Kuurne–Brussels–Kuurne
1st Zele-Puivelde
 2nd Ruddervoorde Koerse
1989
1st Brussel–Ingooigem
1st GP Fina-Fayt-le-Franc
 2nd Tour de Midi-Pyrénées
 3rd GP de Fourmies
 3rd Tour de la Haute-Sambre
 3rd GP Stad Sint-Niklaas 
 3rd GP Frans Melckenbeek
1990
1st  Overall Tour de l'Oise
1st Kuurne–Brussels–Kuurne
1st GP Fina-Fayt-le-Franc
1st Kampioenschap van Vlaanderen-Koolskamp
1st GP de la Haute Sambre 
1st Stage 4b Circuit de la Sarthe
1st Merbes-Le-Chateau
 2nd Nationale Sluitingsprijs
 3rd Flèche Hesbignonne
 3rd Grand Prix du Morbihan
 3rd Grand Prix La Marseillaise
 3rd Grand Prix de Bessèges
10th Overall Circuit de la Sarthe
1st Stage 5
1991
1st Dwars door West-Vlaanderen
1st Izegem Koers
1st Omloop van de Vlasstreek-Heule
1st  Points classification, Tour of Britain
1st Stage 1 Vuelta a Aragón
2nd Brussel–Ingooigem
3rd Tour of Leuven
3rd Kuurne–Brussels–Kuurne
3rd Le Samyn
1992
1st Paris–Tours
1st Stadsprijs Geraardsbergen
1st Stage 6 Vuelta a Andalucía
1st Tour of Leuven
1st Japan Cup
 1st Stage 4 Vuelta a los Valles Mineros
1st Stage 1 Boland Bank Tour
2nd Arnhem–Veenendaal Classic
 3rd Overall Tour of Britain
1st Stages 1 & 5
3rd Kampioenschap van Vlaanderen
3rd GP Stad Zottegem
3rd Omloop Schelde-Durme
1993
1st Stage 1 Route du Sud
2nd Overall Tour d'Armorique
1st  Points classification
1st Stage 4 
1st Moorsele
1st Portsmouth
1st  Sprints Vuelta a España
1st  Sprints Étoile de Bessèges
2nd Ronde van Limburg
3rd Textielprijs Vichte
3rd Omloop Schelde-Durme
1994
1st GP Briek Schotte
1st Stage 2 Boland Bank Tour
1st Strand Classic
1st Erembodegem
1st Aalst
1st Kortemark
1st Desselgem
2nd Kampioenschap van Vlaanderen-Koolskamp
2nd Acht van Chaam
2nd Omloop van de Westkust
1995
1st Omloop van het Waasland-Kemzeke
1st Grote Prijs Stad Zottegem
1st Stage 4 Boland Bank Tour
2nd Kuurne–Brussels–Kuurne
1996
1st GP Gemeente Kortemark 
1st Stage 6 Tour of Portugal
2nd Omloop Het Volk
3rd Dwars door West-Vlaanderen
1997
1st Wanzele

References

External links 

Directeur sportifs
Living people
Belgian male cyclists
1962 births
People from Ninove
Cyclists from East Flanders